Edivaldo Isaías Carvalho Évora Monteiro (born 28 April 1976) is a Guinea-Bissau-born Portuguese hurdler.

He competed at the World Championships in 2001, 2003 and 2005 as well as the Olympic Games in 2004 and 2008 without reaching the final.

His personal best time is 49.10 seconds, achieved in June 2004 in Bern.

Competition record

References

1976 births
Living people
Portuguese male hurdlers
Bissau-Guinean emigrants to Portugal
Athletes (track and field) at the 2004 Summer Olympics
Athletes (track and field) at the 2008 Summer Olympics
Olympic athletes of Portugal
Bissau-Guinean male hurdlers
World Athletics Championships athletes for Portugal